The Eucla cod (Euclichthys polynemus) is a deepwater marine fish belonging to the cod order (Gadiformes).  It is the only species currently classified in the family Euclichthyidae. It is named after the town of Eucla, Western Australia, in whose coastal waters it is found.

The Eucla cod has a long and tapering body, a large mouth, and no chin barbel. It has two nearly contiguous dorsal fins; the first is short based and high, and the second is long-based, extending to the base of the caudal fin. It has no commercial value.

References

 
 

Euclichthyidae
Fish described in 1926